In classical antiquity, the Arginusae ( Arginousai) were three islands off the Dikili Peninsula on the coast of modern-day Turkey, famous as the site of the Battle of Arginusae during the Peloponnesian War. They were also collectively referred to as Canaea after the city of Canae on the largest island. Today two of the islands remain, while the third and largest has become attached to the mainland as a promontory near the modern village of Bademli:

Baston Islands
 Garip Island (literally "Strange Island"); Nisída Ázano
 Kalem Island (literally "Pen Island"); Nikolo, Vráchos Nikolós
 Kane Peninsula or Promontory, called Argennusa in antiquity, when it was an island; Canaea, Canae, Κάνη

Argennusa was the site of the ancient city of Canae.

The names Arginusae and Argennusa come from Ancient Greek arginóeis, argennóeis (ἀργινόεις, ἀργεννόεις), "bright-shining".

References

History of İzmir Province
Islands of Turkey
Aeolis